Norges Skytterforbund (NSF), literally the Norwegian Shooting Association, is a Norwegian umbrella organization for shooting sports, and is internationally affiliated with the International Shooting Sport Federation (ISSF), Fédération Internationale de Tir aux Armes Sportives de Chasse (FITASC) and Precision Pistol Competition (WA1500). NSF was founded in 1946, and is also organized under the Norwegian Olympic and Paralympic Committee and Confederation of Sports.

See also 
 Nordic Shooting Region
 List of shooting sports organizations

Other shooting sport organizations in Norway 
 Det frivillige Skyttervesen
 Dynamic Sports Shooting Norway
 Norwegian Association of Hunters and Anglers
 Norwegian Benchrest Shooting Association
 Norwegian Black Powder Union
 Norwegian Biathlon Association
 Norwegian Metal Silhouette Association
 Scandinavian Western Shooters

Other umbrella organizations for shooting 
 Association of Maltese Arms Collectors and Shooters
 French Shooting Federation
 Finnish Shooting Sport Federation
 Hellenic Shooting Federation
 Monaco Shooting Federation
 Royal Spanish Olympic Shooting Federation
 Swiss Shooting Sport Federation

External links 
 Official homepage of Norges Skytterforbund

Shooting sports organizations
Sports organisations of Norway
1946 establishments in Norway
Sports organizations established in 1946
Regions of the World Association PPC 1500
National members of the European Shooting Confederation